Ani Yeranyan  (born on 4 February 1991) is an Armenian broadcaster and actress. She is known for her roles as Tatevik on Full House (Armenian TV series), Arevik on A Millionaire Wanted.

Filmography

External links 

Page on Armfilm (Russian)

References

1991 births
Living people
Actresses from Yerevan
Armenian film actresses
21st-century Armenian actresses
Armenian stage actresses